Charles Courtin (6 May 1902 – 23 December 1985) was a French long jumper. He competed at the 1920 Summer Olympics and finished 17th. He was killed in action during World War II.

References

External links
 

1902 births
1985 deaths
French male long jumpers
Athletes (track and field) at the 1920 Summer Olympics
Olympic athletes of France